Molinari is an Italian language occupational surname for a miller. Notable people with this surname include:

 Adriana Molinari, American (née Argentine) pornographic actress
 Alberto Molinari (born 1965), Italian actor, producer, and director
 Alessandro Molinari (1898–1962), Italian first General Director of ISTAT
 Anna Molinari, Italian fashion designer, founder of Blumarine and other brands in the  Blufin group
 Antonio Molinari (bishop) (1626–1698), Roman Catholic Bishop of Lettere-Gragnano 
 Antonio Molinari (runner) (born 1967), Italian male mountain runner 
 Bernardino Molinari (1880–1951), Italian composer and conductor
 Carlos Molinari, Argentinian businessman and real-estate developer
 Caroline Molinari (born 1986), Brazilian female artistic gymnast
 Cecilia Molinari (born 1949), former Italian sprinter
 Dave Molinari (born 1955), American sports journalist
 Edoardo Molinari (born 1981), Italian professional golfer and brother of Francesco Molinari
 Elisa Molinari, Italian academic, Fellow in the American Physical Society
 Emilio Molinari (born 1939), Italian politician
 Ettore Molinari (1867–1926), Italian chemist and anarchist
 Federico Molinari (footballer) (born 1979), Argentine footballer
 Federico Molinari (gymnast) (born 1984), Argentine male artistic gymnast and part of the national team
 Francesca Molinari, Italian economist
 Francesco Molinari (born 1982), Italian professional golfer and brother of Edoardo Molinari
 Francesco Molinari-Pradelli (1911–1996), Italian opera conductor
 Giuseppe Molinari (born 1938), Roman Catholic Archbishop of L'Aquila
 Guido Molinari (born 1933), Canadian artist
 Gustave de Molinari (1819–1912), Belgian economist
 Guy Molinari (1928–2018), American politician and father of Susan Molinari
 Jean Baptiste Molinari, French head chef
 Jean-Claude Molinari (born 1931), French tennis player
 Jim Molinari (born 1954), American basketball coach and lawyer
 Karl-Theodor Molinari (1915–1993), officer in the German Army and later in the Bundeswehr
 Luciano Molinari (1880–1940), Italian stage and film actor
 Luigi Molinari (1866–1919), Italian anarchist and lawyer, publisher of the periodical L'Università popolare 
 Luis Molinari (born 1929), Ecuadorian artist
 Manlio Molinari (born 1964), retired Sammarinese athlete
 Maurizio Molinari (born 1964), Italian journalist
 Meredith Molinari, American model and reality show host,
 Michelino Molinari da Besozzo (c. 1370 – c. 1455), Italian painter and illuminator
 Morris Molinari (born 1975), former Italian football defender
 Renato Molinari (born 1946), Italian powerboat racer
 Ricardo Molinari (1898–1996), Argentine poet
 Simona Molinari (born 1983), Italian jazz music singer
 S. Robert Molinari (1897–1957),  American politician from New York
 Susan Molinari (born 1958), American politician and daughter of Guy Molinari
 Susana Molinari Leguizamón, Argentine Spanish, Italian and French language writer active during the 1940s
 Tina Molinari (born 1956), Canadian politician

See also
 Molinari (design), an Italian furniture and home interior company

Italian-language surnames
Occupational surnames